Cefroxadine (INN, trade names Oraspor and Cefthan-DS) is a cephalosporin antibiotic. It is structurally related to cefalexin, and both drugs share a similar spectrum of activity.

It is available in Italy.

Synthesis
Cefroxadine can be prepared by several routes, including one in which the enol is methylated with diazomethane as a key step. A rather more involved route starts with comparatively readily available phenoxymethylpenicillin sulfoxide benzhydryl ester (1).

This undergoes fragmentation when treated with benzothiazole-2-thiol to give 2. Ozonolysis (reductive work-up) cleaves the olefinic linkage and the unsymmetrical disulfide moiety is converted to a tosyl thioester (3). The enol moiety is methylated with diazomethane, the six-membered ring is closed by reaction with 1,5-diazabicyclo[5.4.0]undec-5-ene (DBU), and the ester protection is removed with trifluoroacetic acid to give 4. The amide side chain is removed by the usual PCl5/dimethylaniline sequence followed by reamidation with the appropriate acid chloride to give cefroxadine (5).

See also
 Cefachlor

References

Cephalosporin antibiotics
Enantiopure drugs